The following lists events that happened during 1871 in Australia.

Incumbents

Governors
Governors of the Australian colonies:
Governor of New South Wales – Somerset Lowry-Corry, 4th Earl Belmore
Governor of Queensland – George Phipps, 2nd Marquess of Normanby
Governor of South Australia – Sir James Fergusson
Governor of Tasmania – Charles Du Cane
Governor of Victoria – John Manners-Sutton, 3rd Viscount Canterbury
Governor of Western Australia – The Hon. Sir Frederick Weld GCMG.

Premiers
Premiers of the Australian colonies:
Premier of New South Wales – Sir James Martin
Premier of Queensland – Arthur Hunter Palmer
Premier of South Australia – John Hart until 10 November, then Arthur Blyth
Premier of Tasmania – James Milne Wilson
Premier of Victoria – Sir James McCulloch until 19 June, then Charles Gavan Duffy

Events
 15 March – Australia's first synagogue opens in Adelaide, South Australia.
 5 May – The Prince Alfred Hospital opens in Melbourne.
 19 June – Charles Gavan Duffy assumes office as Premier of Victoria.
 24 September – Mother Mary MacKillop is excommunicated from the Roman Catholic Church after refusing to disband the Sisters of St Joseph of the Sacred Heart order.

Exploration and settlement
 March – Explorer John Ross is the first European to explore and name the Todd River.

Sport
 The South Australian Cricket Association is founded.
 7 November – The Pearl wins the Melbourne Cup

Births
 10 January – Miles Evergood (died 1939), artist
 24 January – Oscar Asche (died 1936), actor and director
 17 February – Florence Anderson, (died 1939) first female trade union secretary in Victoria 
 22 February – Hayden Starke (died 1958), High Court judge
 3 April – John Wren (died 1953), businessman
 20 August – Sydney Long (died 1955), artist
 23 November – William Watt (died 1946), 24th Premier of Victoria

Deaths
 2 January – Sir Samuel Blackall (born 1809), Governor of Queensland
 19 January – Sir William Denison (born 1804), Governor of Van Diemen's Land and New South Wales
 23 April – James Frederick Palmer (born 1803), Victorian politician

References

 
Australia
Years of the 19th century in Australia